In linguistics, deixis is the use of general words and phrases to refer to a specific time, place, or person in context, e.g., the words tomorrow, there, and they. Words are deictic if their semantic meaning is fixed but their denoted meaning varies depending on time and/or place. Words or phrases that require contextual information to be fully understood—for example, English pronouns—are deictic. Deixis is closely related to anaphora. Although this article deals primarily with deixis in spoken language, the concept is sometimes applied to written language, gestures, and communication media as well. In linguistic anthropology, deixis is treated as a particular subclass of the more general semiotic phenomenon of indexicality, a sign "pointing to" some aspect of its context of occurrence.

Although this article draws examples primarily from English, deixis is believed to be a feature (to some degree) of all natural languages.

Types

Traditional categories
Charles J. Fillmore used the term "major grammaticalized types" to refer to the most common categories of contextual information: person, place, and time. Similar categorizations can be found elsewhere.

Personal deixis
Personal deixis, or person deixis, concerns itself with the grammatical persons involved in an utterance: (1) those directly involved (e.g. the speaker, the addressee), (2) those not directly involved (e.g. those who hear the utterance but who are not being directly addressed), and (3) those mentioned in the utterance. In English, the distinctions are generally indicated by pronouns (personal deictical terms are in italics):

I am going to the movies.
Would you like to have dinner?
They tried to hurt me, but she came to the rescue.

In many languages with gendered pronouns, the third-person masculine pronouns (he/his/him in English) are used as a default when referring to a person whose gender is unknown or irrelevant:
To each his own.

In contrast, English for some time used the neuter gender for cases of unspecified gender in the singular (with the use of the plural starting in around the fourteenth century), but many grammarians drew on Latin to come to the preference for "he" in such cases. However, it remains common to use the third-person plural (they/their/them/theirs) even when the antecedent is singular (a phenomenon known as singular they):
To each their own.

In languages that distinguish between masculine and feminine plural pronouns, such as French or Serbo-Croatian, the masculine is again often used as default. "Ils vont à la bibliothèque", "Oni idu u biblioteku" (They go to the library) may refer either to a group of masculine nouns or a group of both masculine and feminine nouns. "Elles vont...", "One idu..." would be used only for a group of feminine nouns. In many such languages, the gender (as a grammatical category) of a noun is only tangentially related to the gender of the thing the noun represents. For example, in French, the generic personne, meaning a person (of either sex), is always a feminine noun, so if the subject of discourse is "les personnes" (the people), the use of "elles" is obligatory, even if the people being considered are all men.

Spatial deixis
Spatial deixis, or place deixis, concerns itself with the spatial locations relevant to an utterance. Similarly to personal deixis, the locations may be either those of the speaker and addressee or those of persons or objects being referred to. The most salient English examples are the adverbs here and there, and the demonstratives this, these, that, and those, although those are far from exclusive.

Some example sentences (spatial deictical terms are in italics):

I enjoy living in this city.
Here is where we will place the statue.
She was sitting over there.

Unless otherwise specified, spatial deictical terms are generally understood to be relative to the location of the speaker, as in:

The shop is across the street.

where "across the street" is understood to mean "across the street from where I [the speaker] am right now." Although "here" and "there" are often used to refer to locations near to and far from the speaker, respectively, as in:

Here is a good spot; it is too sunny over there.

"there" can also refer to the location of the addressee, if they are not in the same location as the speaker, as in:

How is the weather there?
 Deictic projection: In some contexts, spatial deixis is used metaphorically rather than physically, i.e. the speaker is not speaking as the deictic center. For example: I am coming home now.

The above utterance would generally denote the speaker's going home from their own point of reference, yet it appears to be perfectly normal for one to project his physical presence to his home rather than away from home. Here is another example:

I am not here; please leave a message.

Despite its common usage to address people who call when no one answers the phone, the here here is semantically contradictory to the speaker's absence. Nevertheless, this is considered normal for most people as speakers have to project themselves as answering the phone when in fact they are not physically present.

Languages usually show at least a two-way referential distinction in their deictic system: proximal, i.e. near or closer to the speaker; and distal, i.e. far from the speaker and/or closer to the addressee. English exemplifies this with such pairs as this and that, here and there, etc.

In other languages, the distinction is three-way or higher: proximal, i.e. near the speaker; medial, i.e. near the addressee; and distal, i.e. far from both. This is the case in a few Romance languages and in Serbo-Croatian, Korean, Japanese, Thai, Filipino, Macedonian, Yaqui, and Turkish. The archaic English forms yon and yonder (still preserved in some regional dialects) once represented a distal category that has now been subsumed by the formerly medial "there". In the Sinhala language, there is a four-way deixis system for both person and place; near the speaker /me_ː/, near the addressee /o_ː/, close to a third person, visible /arə_ː/ and far from all, not visible /e_ː/.  The Malagasy language has seven degrees of distance combined with two degrees of visibility, while many Inuit languages have even more complex systems.

Temporal deixis
Temporal deixis, or time deixis, concerns itself with the various times involved in and referred to in an utterance. This includes time adverbs like "now", "then", and "soon", as well as different verbal tenses. A further example is the word tomorrow, which denotes the next consecutive day after any day it is used. "Tomorrow," when spoken on a day last year, denoted a different day from "tomorrow" when spoken next week. Time adverbs can be relative to the time when an utterance is made (what Fillmore calls the "encoding time", or ET) or the time when the utterance is heard (Fillmore's "decoding time", or DT).  Although these are frequently the same time, they can differ, as in the case of prerecorded broadcasts or correspondence. For example, if one were to write (temporal deictical terms are in italics):

It is raining now, but I hope when you read this it will be sunny.

the ET and DT would be different, with "now" referring to the moment the sentence is written and "when" referring to the moment the sentence is read.

Tenses are generally separated into absolute (deictic) and relative tenses. So, for example, simple English past tense is absolute, such as in:

He went.

whereas the pluperfect is relative to some other deictically specified time, as in:

He had gone.

Other categories
Though the traditional categories of deixis are perhaps the most obvious, there are other types of deixis that are similarly pervasive in language use. These categories of deixis were first discussed by Fillmore and Lyons, and were echoed in works of others.

Discourse deixis
Discourse deixis, also referred to as text deixis, refers to the use of expressions within an utterance to refer to parts of the discourse that contain the utterance—including the utterance itself. For example, in:

This is a great story.

"this" refers to an upcoming portion of the discourse; and in:

That was an amazing account.

"that" refers to a prior portion of the discourse.

Distinction must be made between discourse deixis and anaphora, which is when an expression makes reference to the same referent as a prior term, as in:

Matthew is an incredible athlete; he came in first in the race.
In this case, "he" is not deictical because, within the above sentence, its denotative meaning of Matthew is maintained regardless of the speaker, where or when the sentence is used, etc.

Lyons points out that it is possible for an expression to be both deictic and anaphoric at the same time. In his example:

I was born in London, and I have lived here/there all my life.

"here" or "there" function anaphorically in their reference to London, and deictically in that the choice between "here" or "there" indicates whether the speaker is or is not currently in London.

The rule of thumb to distinguish the two phenomena is as follows: when an expression refers to another linguistic expression or a piece of discourse, it is discourse deictic. When that expression refers to the same item as a prior linguistic expression, it is anaphoric.

Switch reference is a type of discourse deixis, and a grammatical feature found in some languages, which indicates whether the argument of one clause is the same as the argument of the previous clause. In some languages, this is done through same subject markers and different subject markers. In the translated example "John punched Tom, and left-[same subject marker]," it is John who left, and in "John punched Tom, and left-[different subject marker]," it is Tom who left.

Discourse deixis has been observed in internet language, particularly with the use of iconic language forms resembling arrows.

Social deixis
Social deixis concerns the social information that is encoded within various expressions, such as relative social status and familiarity. Two major forms of it are the so-called T–V distinctions and honorifics.
 T–V distinction

T–V distinctions, named for the Latin "tu" and "vos" (singular and plural versions of "you"), is the name given to the phenomenon when a language has at least two different second-person pronouns. The varying usage of these pronouns indicates something about formality, familiarity, and/or solidarity between the interactants. So, for example, the T form might be used when speaking to a friend or social equal, whereas the V form would be used speaking to a stranger or social superior. This phenomenon is common in European languages.
 Honorifics

Honorifics are a much more complex form of social deixis than T–V distinctions, though they encode similar types of social information. They can involve words being marked with various morphemes as well as nearly entirely different lexicons being used based on the social status of the interactants. This type of social deixis is found in a variety of languages, but is especially common in South and East Asia. Persian also makes wide use of honorifics.

Technology

Technological deixis is a reference to the forms and purposes literacy takes as technology changes the nature of literacy in general (e.g., how one reads a webpage, navigates new software, etc.), how those literacies might be expressed, and the speed and efficiency with which those literacies might change (Leu, Kinzer, Coiro, and Cammack, 2004; http://www.readingonline.org/electronic/elec_index.asp?HREF=/electronic/RT/3-01_Column/index.html).

Anaphoric reference

Generally speaking, anaphora refers to the way in which a word or phrase relates to other text:
 An exophoric reference refers to language outside of the text in which the reference is found.
 A homophoric reference is a generic phrase that obtains a specific meaning through knowledge of its context. For example, the meaning of the phrase "the Queen" may be determined by the country in which it is spoken. Because there may be many Queens throughout the world when the sentence is used, the location of the speaker provides the extra information that allows an individual Queen to be identified.
 An endophoric reference refers to something inside of the text in which the reference is found.
 An anaphoric reference, when opposed to cataphora, refers to something within a text that has been previously identified. For example, in "Susan dropped the plate. It shattered loudly," the word it refers to the phrase, "the plate".
 A cataphoric reference refers to something within a text that has not yet been identified. For example, in "Since he was very cold, David promptly put on his coat," the identity of he is unknown until the individual is also referred to as "David".

Deictic center
A deictic center, sometimes referred to as an origo, is a set of theoretical points that a deictic expression is 'anchored' to, such that the evaluation of the meaning of the expression leads one to the relevant point. As deictic expressions are frequently egocentric, the center often consists of the speaker at the time and place of the utterance and, additionally, the place in the discourse and relevant social factors. However, deictic expressions can also be used in such a way that the deictic center is transferred to other participants in the exchange or to persons / places / etc. being described in a narrative. So, for example, in the sentence;

I am standing here now.

the deictic center is simply the person at the time and place of speaking. But say two people are talking on the phone long-distance, from London to New York. The Londoner can say;

We are going to London next week.

in which case the deictic center is in London, or they can equally validly say;

We are coming to New York next week.

in which case the deictic center is in New York. Similarly, when telling a story about someone, the deictic center is likely to switch to him, her or they (third-person pronouns). So then in the sentence;

He then ran twenty feet to the left.

it is understood that the center is with the person being spoken of, and thus, "to the left" refers not to the speaker's left, but to the object of the story's left, that is, the person referred to as 'he' at the time immediately before he ran twenty feet.

Usages
It is helpful to distinguish between two usages of deixis, gestural and symbolic, as well as non-deictic usages of frequently deictic words. Gestural deixis refers, broadly, to deictic expressions whose understanding requires some sort of audio-visual information. A simple example is when an object is pointed at and referred to as "this" or "that". However, the category can include other types of information than pointing, such as direction of gaze, tone of voice, and so on. Symbolic usage, by contrast, requires generally only basic spatio-temporal knowledge of the utterance. So, for example

I broke this finger.

requires being able to see which finger is being held up, whereas

I love this city.

requires only knowledge of the current location. In a similar vein,

I went to this city one time ...

is a non-deictic usage of "this", which does not identify anywhere specifically. Rather, it is used as an indefinite article, much the way "a" could be used in its place.

Deixis and indexicality
The terms deixis and indexicality are frequently used almost interchangeably, and both deal with essentially the same idea of contextually-dependent references. However, the two terms have different histories and traditions. In the past, deixis was associated specifically with spatiotemporal reference, and indexicality was used more broadly. More importantly, each is associated with a different field of study. Deixis is associated with linguistics, and indexicality is associated with philosophy as well as pragmatics.

See also 
 Anaphora
 Deictic field and narration
 Demonstrative
 Generic antecedents
 Metaphysics of presence
 Observation
 Present
 Pro-form
 Self

Notes

References

Further reading
 Anderson, Stephen R.; & Keenan, Edward L. (1985). Deixis. In T. Shopen (Ed.), Language typology and syntactic description: Grammatical categories and the lexicon (Vol. 3, pp. 259–308). Cambridge: Cambridge University Press.
 Fillmore, Charles J. (1966). Deictic categories in the semantics of 'come'. Foundations of Language, 2, 219–227.
 Fillmore, Charles J. (1982). Towards a descriptive framework for spatial deixis. In R. J. Jarvell & W. Klein (Eds.), Speech, place and action: Studies in deixis and related topics (pp. 31–59). London: Wiley.
 Gaynesford, M. de I: The Meaning of the First Person Term, Oxford, Oxford University Press, 2006.
 George Grigore, La deixis spatial dans l'arabe parlé à Bagdad, Estudios de dialectologia arabe n.7, Zaragoza, pp 77–90 George Grigore. 2012. „La deixis spatiale dans l’arabe parlé à Bagdad”, Alexandrine Barontini, Christophe Pereira, Ángeles Vicente, Karima Ziamari (ed.), Estudios de dialectología árabe (n.7): Hommage offert à Dominique Caubet . Universidad de Zaragoza. pp: 77-90
  Summary.
 Traut, Gregory P. and Kazzazi, Kerstin. 1996. Dictionary of Language and Linguistics. Routledge. London and New York.

External links 

 Demonstratives & Indexicals at Internet Encyclopedia of Philosophy
  What is deixis?

Pragmatics
Semantics